DSB, an abbreviation of Danske Statsbaner (Danish State Railways), is the largest Danish train operating company, and the largest in Scandinavia. While DSB is responsible for passenger train operation on most of the Danish railways, goods transport and railway maintenance are outside its scope. DSB runs a commuter rail system, called the S-train, in the area around the Danish capital, Copenhagen, that connects the different areas and suburbs in the greater metropolitan area. Between 2010 and 2017, DSB operated trains in Sweden.

DSB was founded in 1885, when the state-owned companies De jysk-fynske Statsbaner and De sjællandske Statsbaner merged. DSB was established in 1885, after the state in 1867 under the name De Jutland-Fynske Statsbaner took over the private company Det Danske Jernbanedriftselskab and in 1880 they also took over the privately owned Zealand Railway Company.

History
The first railways in Denmark were built and operated by private companies. The railways in Funen and Jutland were built by Peto and Betts who also supplied the locomotives (built by Canada Works, Birkenhead). Most of the technical staff was also recruited from Britain, notably from the Eastern Counties Railway. When Peto and Betts went into insolvency, the Danish state took over Det danske Jernbane-Driftsselskab (The Danish Railway Operating Company) as of 1 September 1867 under the name De jysk-fyenske Jernbaner (the Funen and Jutland Railways), from 1874 De danske Statsbaner i Jylland og Fyn (The Danish State Railways in Jutland and Funen). The network was extended by new construction and by acquisition of the privately operated lines from Silkeborg to Herning (1 November 1879) and from Grenaa to Randers and Aarhus (1 April 1881).

The Danish state took over Det sjællandske Jernbaneselskab (the Railway Company of Zealand) on 1 January 1880, forming De sjællandske Statsbaner (the State Railways of Zealand). With the majority of railways on both sides of the Great Belt thus owned by the Danish state, it was not until 1 October 1885 that the companies of Jutland/Funen and Zealand merged into one national railway company, De danske Statsbaner (the Danish State Railways), the merger being finalised on 1 April 1893.

After the merger, new lines were constructed and a new generation of rolling stock and locomotives were introduced by chief mechanical engineer Otto Busse. After Busse's retirement, however, DSB ceased to design its own locomotives and increasingly came to rely on outside suppliers, mainly Borsig of Berlin.

The 1930s were a decade of innovation and modernisation for DSB. New railway bridges were built across the Little Belt (1935), the Storstrøm (1937) and Oddesund (1938), eliminating the costly and time-consuming process of transfer by steam ferry. The suburban lines in and around Copenhagen were electrified for multiple-unit operation at 1,500 Volts DC (S-trains). Early experiments with Diesel propulsion led to the development of the all-purpose MO class heavy diesel-electric railcar equipped for multiple-unit operation, after World War II also fitted for push-pull operation with a driving trailer. Several classes of mainline diesel-electric locomotives were also built as prototypes by Burmeister and Wain of Copenhagen and Frichs of Aarhus, but further development was cut short by the German occupation and the consequent shortage of oil supplies, forcing DSB to rely on coal-burning steam locomotives for mainline duties.

Coinciding with the opening of the Little Belt Bridge in 1935, DSB introduced their new express train concept known as lyntog ("lightning trains"). These diesel-powered three- and four-coach trains, having a power car at each end with a power pack identical to that of the MO railcar series, featured a then-impressive top speed of 120 km/h as well as a high level of comfort, and they proved themselves DSB's most commercially successful initiative of the 1930s.

World War II left DSB with a fleet of outdated and worn-out trains, and apart from a series of second-generation MO railcars and the class MT multi-purpose centercab engines built by Frichs, domestic industry was unable to provide the kind of motive power required. Instead, DSB looked to foreign suppliers.

General Motors' diesel-electric locomotives had proved themselves in the US and Canada before the war. DSB's MV class A1A-A1A diesel locomotives, built on license from GM and delivered from NOHAB starting in 1954, were found to be very reliable and economically feasible compared to the steam locomotives, eventually putting the age of steam to an end as well as being a decisive factor in DSB's choice of motive power for nearly three decades. They were followed by the equally successful MX class with a lower axle load for branch line services and the MZ class for heavy express services.

Based on three diesel-hydraulic shunting locomotives built by Henschel and acquired by DSB, Frichs developed their own version of the class MH shunter, which replaced the steam-powered shunting engines. After the success of the Deutsche Bundesbahn's DB Class VT 11.5 class on Trans Europ Express services, DSB acquired eleven power cars and matching intermediate cars to replace the first-generation lyntog.

The 1960s were marked by an increasingly poor economy for DSB, leading to a steady staff reduction throughout the decade. However, this was also accompanied by the appearance of new technology, notably the utilisation of electronic equipment, improving the safety and efficiency of DSB's railway traffic. In 1972, along with the celebration of the 125th anniversary of railways in Denmark, DSB introduced a new corporate design by architect Jens Nielsen, inspired by British Rail and Canadian National Railways, with red as the dominant colour (with engine rooms of locomotives painted black), replacing the traditional maroon livery with yellow winged wheel symbols. DSB's position was additionally strengthened by the 1973 oil crisis.

Following the lead of the Nederlandse Spoorwegen, British Rail and Deutsche Bundesbahn, DSB in 1974 introduced a fixed interval timetable for its long-distance locomotive-hauled Intercity trains as well as the commuter services to and from Copenhagen. On regional services in Funen and Jutland, the prewar design MO class railcars were displaced by MR class DMUs, a licensed version of the Deutsche Bundesbahn class 628.

In 1990, after a delay of several years, the IC3 trains came into use, initially as lyntog, and in 1991 as ordinary intercity trains. The IC3 trains, being a specimen of the Flexliner type of multiple units, have a distinct appearance due to the rubber-framed ends, allowing access between trainsets when coupled together. The re-engined Flexliners are now (2014) nearing the end of their service life, but due to problems with the Ansaldo Breda built successor class IC4 they are expected to remain in service for another five to ten years.

The Great Belt Fixed Link was opened for railway traffic in 1997 (a year before road traffic), replacing DSB's railway ferries. In 1997, infrastructural duties were branched off into a new agency under the Danish Ministry of Transport, Banestyrelsen (now: Banedanmark), leaving DSB with the task of train operation. A new design was presented on 30 April 1998, as well as the announcement of the "Good Trains for All" plan, seeking to replace old and less comfortable trains by 2006/2007. DSB was turned into an independent public corporation on 1 January 1999.

The goods department of DSB, DSB Gods, was merged with Railion (now DB Cargo) in 2001, and DSB now solely manages passenger rail service, including the operation of railway stations. In 2003, Arriva, in competition with DSB, won the tender for operating a number of regional railway services in Jutland: Tønder-Esbjerg, Esbjerg-Struer, Skjern-Aarhus, Struer-Langå-Aarhus and Struer-Thisted. In 2007, the Øresundståg services were hived off into a separate company, DSBFirst, but the contract was terminated in 2011 after financial problems.

DSB operated services from 2009 in Sweden. In 2010, it purchased a 50 % shareholding in German operator Vias from Frankfurt Transport Company. All the operating companies in Sweden and Germany were sold between 2013 and 2019.

Logo history

Corporate structure

DSB is an independent public state-owned corporation under the Danish Ministry of Transport and Energy. This has been the case since 1999, and is the result of a former political desire to privatise the Danish railways. Thus, DSB now operates on a for-profit basis, although it retains certain public service commitments via contracts with the Ministry of Transport and Energy. In March 2015, the ongoing privatization process was put on hold until at least 2024, as part of a broad centre-left political majority agreement on passenger rail-transport.

As of 2005, DSB employs about 9,000 people. Keld Sengeløv became president and CEO in February 2004, after a career in the DSB organization since 1997, but died from an undisclosed illness while travelling with friends in Scotland on 3 September 2006. His successor was Søren Eriksen, who was dismissed in March 2011 following the discovery of financial and contractual irregularities. He was largely exonerated in a subsequent inquiry. His successor, Jesper Lok, was announced in December 2011 and took office in April 2012, but resigned in 2014. Since 2015, former fighter pilot Flemming Jensen has been CEO for the corporation.

Divisions
DSB SOV (Selvstændig Offentlig Virksomhed / Independent Public Company)
 DSB Commercial (sales and marketing)
 DSB International (train operations abroad), DSB Detail a/s (management of shops on DSB stations)
 DSB S-tog a/s (operation of the S-train network)
 DSB Sales
 DSB Long-Distance & Regional Trains
 IC4 Programme, Sales, Onboard Service, Traffic,
 DSB Finance
 DSB Property Development, DSB Property
 DSB HR & Organisation
 Financial Management, IT, CSR
 DSB Vedligehold A/S (Train Maintenance)

Services

As an originally state-owned company, DSB has experienced several reforms since its establishment in 1885. In particular, the large scale privatization reforms of Denmark in the 1990s, has resulted in the selling and outsourcing of many railway lines and services across the country.

DSB currently operates several types of passenger trains, varying in number of stops and motive power. Apart from the S-trains, types available for the general public include:
 Regional trains (RØ in Eastern Denmark, RV in Western Denmark; ØR in the Øresund Region)
 Inter-regional trains (IR)
 InterCity trains (IC)
 InterCityLyn (L) (express InterCity trains)
 InterCityLyn Nonstop (IL) (IntercityLyn calling at fewer stations)
 EuroCity trains (EC)

See also 
 Banedanmark
 List of DSB locomotives and multiple units
 Transportation in Denmark
 Rail transport in Denmark
 History of rail transport in Denmark
 Arriva
 DB Schenker Rail
 List of DSB railway stations

References

Sources
 Koed, Jan (1997). Danmarks Jernbaner i 150 år. Forlaget Kunst og Kultur. .

External links 

 
 Profile of the DSB Group
  DSB: History and nostalgia 
 
 Banedanmark - Danish Rail Transport Agency
 Railway history of Denmark, from Banedanmark
 Danish Ministry of Transport and Energy

Railway companies of Denmark
Transport companies based in Copenhagen
Railway companies established in 1885
Danish companies established in 1885
Public corporations of the Danish Government
Danish brands
Railway infrastructure companies
Companies based in Høje-Taastrup Municipality